Thomas Woodruff may refer to:

 Thomas Woodruff (artist) (born 1957), American artist
 Thomas M. Woodruff (1804–1855), United States congressman
 Tom Woodruff (born 1943), American politician in Florida
 Tom Woodruff Jr. (born 1959), American actor, director and special effects supervisor